Alschomine is an indole alkaloid first identified in the leaves of Alstonia scholaris in 1989.

See also
Picrinine

References

Alkaloids